Four-time defending champion Rafael Nadal defeated Novak Djokovic in the final, 6–3, 2–6, 6–1 to win the singles tennis title at the 2009 Monte-Carlo Masters.

Seeds
The top eight seeds receive a bye into the second round.

Draw

Finals

Top half

Section 1

Section 2

Bottom half

Section 3

Section 4

Qualifying

Seeds

Qualifiers

Draw

First qualifier

Second qualifier

Third qualifier

Fourth qualifier

Fifth qualifier

Sixth qualifier

Seventh qualifier

External links
Main Draw
Qualifying Draw

Singles